Local elections were held in Makati on May 9, 2016, within the Philippine general election. The voters elected for the elective local posts in the city: the mayor, vice mayor, the two Congressmen, and the eight councilors, eight in each of the city's two legislative districts.

Background
Acting Mayor Kid Peña will run for the mayoral position against a "still to be determined" mayoralty bet from the United Nationalist Alliance. That "still to be determined" candidate turned out to be outgoing 2nd District Representative Mar-Len Abigail "Abby" Binay-Campos, who replaced her brother Junjun. Binay was disqualified for running by the Ombudsman due to the overpriced Makati City Hall II Parking building anomaly.

Aside from Peña and Binay, Theater and Stage Play director Jimboy Jumawan is reportedly running for Mayor under the banner of Partido Bagong Maharlika party.

In the Vice Mayoralty election, Makati 1st District Representative Monique Lagdameo of UNA and Karla Mercado of Liberal, the daughter of former Makati vice mayor and primary witness of Binay's corruption cases, Ernesto Mercado, declared their candidacy for Vice Mayor. Lagdameo and Mercado will also face PBM's Edgardo Padrigon and Glenn Enciso for the vice mayoralty race.

On March 18, Binay, Jumawan and Peña signed a peace covenant, pledging for a secured and peaceful elections in Makati, the peace covenant signing happened in a pre-campaign period event organized by COMELEC, PNP and PPCRV at the University of Makati grounds.

Campaign
Binay and Peña started their campaigns on March 28, 2016, 2 days after the start of the local candidates' campaign period. Incumbent mayor Kid Peña holds his proclamation rally, together with his running mate Karla Mercado at the Plaza Lawton to jump start his campaign dubbed as "Bagong Makati" (The New Makati). He stated that the major supporters and former allies of the Binay family are backing out their support to the Binays and they are campaigned for Peña's candidacy.

Binay formally started their campaign at the intersection of Metropolitan Avenue, Pasong Tamo and P. Ocampo Extension. Jejomar Binay, Abby's father and presidential candidate for the United Nationalist Alliance, Jejomar Binay, and his running mate Gregorio Honasan were present in the rally. Binay said after the rally that her surname is a "blessing" and a "curse", despite being part of a political dynasty.

Her brother, Junjun Binay was affected on the corruption issues faced him by his critics and enemies and he criticized Peña's performance as mayor of Makati. He also criticized Pena's affiliated party, the Liberal Party due to vote buying.

Candidates

Representative

1st District
Incumbent Rep. Monique Lagdameo decided not to seek re-election in order to run for Vice Mayor. Ichi Yabut was supposed to run under the United Nationalist Alliance, but declared that she will instead seek re-election for councilor. Actor and councilor Monsour del Rosario took her stead.

2nd District
Incumbent representative Mar-Len Abigail "Abby" Binay-Campos is term-limited; she will run as city mayor. Her husband, Luis Campos would run under her 
party, the United Nationalist Alliance, running against Israel "Boyet" Cruzado, a city councilor for the district.

Mayor

Vice Mayor

Councilors

1st District

|colspan=5 bgcolor=black|

2nd District

|colspan=5 bgcolor=black|

References

External links
COMELEC's List of Local Candidates for Verification

2016 Philippine local elections
Elections in Makati
2016 elections in Metro Manila